Hallandale Beach (formerly known simply as Hallandale) is a city in southern Broward County, Florida, United States. The city is named after Luther Halland, the son of a Swedish worker for Henry Flagler's Florida East Coast Railroad. As of the 2010 census, the population was 37,113.

The city is known as the home of Gulfstream Park (horse racing and casino) and Mardi Gras Casino, a greyhound racing track which hosts the World Classic. It also has a sizable financial district, with offices for a number of banks and brokerage houses, plus many restaurants. Due to the large number of tourists who eventually retire in the city, Hallandale Beach has one of the fastest-growing populations in Broward County and in Metro Miami.

History

Hallandale Beach, like most of Broward County, had no permanent European-descended population until the end of the 19th century. Seminole Indians, in settlements that lay inland of the Atlantic shore, hunted in the area and gathered coontie roots to produce arrowroot starch.  The northern edge of Hallandale Beach (along Pembroke Road) still features noticeable hammocks, points elevated above sea level in the distant past. 

Railroad magnate Henry Flagler, owner of the Florida East Coast Railway, recruited Luther Halland, a brother-in-law of Flagler's agents, to found a settlement south of the community of Dania. Halland and Swedish immigrant Olaf Zetterlund touted the frost-free climate and cheap land of the settlement (then named Halland, later changed to Hallandale). Halland constructed a small trading post and became the first postmaster of the small community.

By 1900, the community had slowly grown to a dozen families—seven of Swedish, three of English, and two of African descent. In 1904 the first school was built, and the first church followed two years later. Hallandale was primarily a farming community; the beach was undeveloped and used by the residents only for recreational purposes.

Hallandale was incorporated on 11 May 1927, the eighth municipality in Broward County. By that time, a thriving community of 1,500 residents, with electricity and street lights, was in place. In 1947, Hallandale was reincorporated as the City of Hallandale, allowing it to expand its borders through annexation of nearby unincorporated land lying adjacent to the Atlantic shore.  On August 27, 1999, the city officially changed its name to Hallandale Beach.

Hurricane Katrina first made landfall between Hallandale Beach and Aventura, Florida.

Hurricane Irma was originally expected to go right through Hallandale Beach, instead making landfall in Key West, and once again in Naples.

Geography

Hollywood is located north of Hallandale Beach, Aventura in Miami-Dade County is south of the city, the Atlantic Ocean is to the east, and Pembroke Park is to the west.

Although it appears from a map that a small portion of the Golden Isles neighborhood extends into Miami-Dade County, this land was actually transferred to Broward County, and annexed to Hallandale Beach in 1978.

Demographics

2020 census

As of the 2020 United States census, there were 41,217 people, 17,573 households, and 9,104 families residing in the city.

2010 census

As of 2012, excluding the Canadian and Hispanic and Latino population, 8.2% of the residents were of West Indian or Caribbean ancestry, 5.3% were American, 5.2% were Russian, 3.4% German, 2.8% Irish, and 2.7% of the populace shared Polish ancestry.

There were 18,051 households, out of which 12.5% had children under the age of 18 living with them, 35.8% were married couples living together, 9.1% had a female householder with no husband present, and 51.8% were non-families. 45.2% of all households were made up of individuals, and 25.8% had someone living alone who was 65 years of age or older.  The average household size was 1.88 and the average family size was 2.60.

In the city, the population was spread out, with 13.2% under the age of 18, 5.3% from 18 to 24, 22.9% from 25 to 44, 22.8% from 45 to 64, and 35.8% who were 65 years of age or older.  The median age was 53 years. For every 100 females, there were 85.6 males.  For every 100 females age 18 and over, there were 82.6 males.

The median income for a household in the city was $28,266, and the median income for a family was $37,171. Males had a median income of $31,287 versus $24,882 for females. The per capita income for the city was $22,464.  About 13.1% of families and 16.8% of the population were below the poverty line, including 26.4% of those under age 18 and 13.0% of those age 65 or over.

As of the year 2000, English was spoken as a first language by 59.66% of the population, while Spanish was spoken by 19.50% of the populace. In this "southernmost Canadian city" French was spoken by 5.23% of the population, most of them French Canadians. Other languages spoken at home were Romanian at 2.71%, Italian at 1.96%, French Creole at 1.80%, Yiddish 1.70%, Russian 1.32%, German 1.27%, Hungarian at 1.17%, Polish at 0.85%, Hebrew at 0.77%, and Portuguese, spoken by 0.72% of all residents.

Public schools

Hallandale Beach's public schools are part of Broward County Public Schools.

In almost all areas, elementary and middle school students are zoned for Gulfstream Academy of Hallandale Beach K–8. A portion of the city is zoned to Colbert Elementary School and McNicol Middle School. In all areas, high school students are zoned for Hallandale High School. Private academies eschewing the public system are present in the area.

Media

Hallandale Beach is a part of the Miami-Fort Lauderdale-Hollywood media market, which is the 12th largest radio market and the 17th largest television market in the United States. Its primary daily newspapers are the South Florida-Sun Sentinel and The Miami Herald, and their Spanish-language counterparts El Sentinel and El Nuevo Herald. The Broward-Palm Beach New Times, an alternative weekly, is widely available around the city. Hallandale Beach has its own newspaper, The South Florida Sun-Times which is published weekly.

Public transportation

Hallandale Beach is served by several bus routes operated by Broward County Transit.

A free community minibus service, operated by the city of Hallandale Beach, also operates on four routes within the city limits and neighboring areas of Hollywood and Aventura.

Notable people

 Iris Acker (1930–2018), arts advocate, actress (Flight of the Navigator), dancer and television host 
 Stewart H. Appleby (1890–1964), represented  from 1925–1927, and retired to Hallandale Beach
 Morris Childs (1902–1991), double agent for the F.B.I. against the Soviet Union. Childs lived in a Hallandale safe house from his retirement in 1986 until his death in 1991
 Davin Joseph, 1st Round NFL Pick Tampa Bay Buccaneers 2006
 Meyer Lansky (1902–1983), Jewish gangster; financial wizard of the National Crime Syndicate
Anthony Provenzano, mobster featured in the movie The Irishman

See also

 Hallandale Beach Police Department

References

External links
 City of Hallandale Beach official site

Cities in Broward County, Florida
Populated coastal places in Florida on the Atlantic Ocean
Cities in Florida
Beaches of Broward County, Florida
Beaches of Florida
1927 establishments in Florida
Populated places established in 1927